Bernd Kuhn (born 17 August 1944) is a German former ice hockey player. He competed in the men's tournaments at the 1968 Winter Olympics and the 1972 Winter Olympics.

References

External links
 

1944 births
Living people
German ice hockey players
Ice hockey players at the 1968 Winter Olympics
Ice hockey players at the 1972 Winter Olympics
Olympic ice hockey players of West Germany
Sportspeople from Füssen